The Toutunhe District is one of 7 urban districts of the prefecture-level city of Wulumuqi, the capital of Xinjiang Uygur Autonomous Region, Northwest China, it is located to the northwest of Ürümqi's urban core. According to the 2002 census, it has a population of 130,000.

County-level divisions of Xinjiang
Ürümqi